The Japanese Instrument of Surrender was the written agreement that formalized the surrender of the Empire of Japan, marking the end of hostilities in World War II. It was signed by representatives from the Empire of Japan and from the Allied nations: the United States of America, the Republic of China, the United Kingdom of Great Britain and Northern Ireland, the Union of Soviet Socialist Republics, the Commonwealth of Australia, the Dominion of Canada, the Provisional Government of the French Republic, the Kingdom of the Netherlands, and the Dominion of New Zealand.

The date is sometimes known as Victory over Japan Day, although that designation more frequently refers to the date of Emperor Hirohito's Gyokuon-hōsō (Imperial Rescript of Surrender), the radio broadcast announcement of the acceptance of the terms of the Potsdam Declaration at noon Japan Standard Time on 15 August.

Preparation
General Douglas MacArthur's staff, headed by Colonel LeGrande A. Diller, were tasked to prepare the draft of the Instrument of Surrender. This was a challenge given resources were limited in war-torn Manila.  Nevertheless, an enterprising staff member found rare parchment in a basement of a monastery, and this was given to MacArthur's printer.

Surrender ceremony

The ceremony aboard the deck of the Missouri lasted 23 minutes and was broadcast throughout the world. The instrument was first signed by the Japanese foreign minister Mamoru Shigemitsu "By Command and on behalf of the Emperor of Japan and the Japanese Government" (9:04 a.m.). General Yoshijirō Umezu, Chief of the Army General Staff, then signed the document "By Command and on behalf of the Japanese Imperial General Headquarters" (9:06 a.m.).
The Japanese representatives present for the signing were the following:
  Foreign Minister Mamoru Shigemitsu
  General Yoshijirō Umezu, Chief of the Army General Staff
  Major General Yatsuji Nagai
  Katsuo Okazaki (Foreign Ministry)
  Rear Admiral Tadatoshi Tomioka
  Toshikazu Kase (Foreign Ministry)
  Lt. General Suichi Miyakazi
  Rear Admiral Ichiro Yokoyama
  Saburo Ota (Foreign Ministry)
  Captain Katsuo Shiba (Navy)
  Colonel Kaziyi Sugita

At 9:08 a.m., American General of the Army Douglas MacArthur, the Commander in the Southwest Pacific and Supreme Commander for the Allied Powers, accepted the surrender on behalf of the Allied Powers and signed in his capacity as Supreme Commander.

After MacArthur, the following representatives signed the instrument of surrender on behalf of each of the Allied Powers:
 Fleet Admiral Chester Nimitz for the United States (9:12 a.m.)
 General Hsu Yung-chang for China (9:13 a.m.)
 Admiral Sir Bruce Fraser for the United Kingdom (9:14 a.m.)
 Lieutenant General Kuzma Derevyanko for the Soviet Union (9:16 a.m.)
 General Sir Thomas Blamey for Australia (9:17 a.m.)
 Colonel Lawrence Moore Cosgrave for Canada (9:18 a.m.)
 Général de Corps d'Armée Philippe Leclerc de Hauteclocque for France (9:20 a.m.)
 Lieutenant Admiral C. E. L. Helfrich for the Netherlands (9:21 a.m.)
 Air Vice-Marshal Leonard M. Isitt for New Zealand (9:22 a.m.)

The UK invited Dominion governments to send representatives to the ceremony as subordinates to its own. MacArthur supported the government of Australia's demand to attend and sign separately from the UK, although Australia objected to his recommendation that Canada, the Netherlands, and France also sign the document.

On 6 September, Colonel Bernard Theilen took the document and an imperial rescript to Washington, D.C., and presented them to President Harry S. Truman in a formal White House ceremony the following day. The documents were then exhibited at the National Archives.

Flags at the ceremony

The deck of the Missouri was furnished with two American flags. A commonly heard story is that one of the flags had flown over the White House on the day Pearl Harbor was attacked. However, Captain Stuart Murray of USS Missouri explained:

That special flag on the veranda deck of the Missouri had been flown from Commodore Matthew Perry's flagship in 1853–54 when he led the U.S. Navy's Far East Squadron into Tokyo Bay to force the opening of Japan's ports to foreign trade. MacArthur was a direct descendant of the New England Perry family and cousin of Commodore Matthew Perry.

Photographs of the signing ceremony show that this flag is displayed reverse side showing (stars in the upper right corner). This was because American flags on the right of an object plane, ship, or person have the stars on the upper right corner, to look like the flag is heading into as if attached to a pole and someone is carrying it. Stars in the upper left of a flag displayed on the right side of the object could make the flag look like it were going away from battle. The cloth of the historic flag was so fragile that the conservator at the U.S. Naval Academy Museum directed that a protective backing be sewn on it, leaving its "wrong side" visible; and this was how Perry's 31-star flag was presented on this unique occasion.

A replica of this historic flag can be seen today on the Surrender Deck of the Battleship Missouri Memorial in Pearl Harbor. This replica is also placed in the same location on the bulkhead of the veranda deck where it had been initially mounted on the morning of 2 September 1945, by Chief Carpenter Fred Miletich. The original flag is still on display at the Naval Academy Museum, as is the table and tablecloth upon which the instrument of surrender was signed, and the original bronze plaque marking the location of the signing (which was replaced by two replicas in 1990). However, it is not certain that the table is the actual one used as the deck had been cleaned and items returned to storage before anyone thought to save it.

Differences between versions

The Japanese copy of the treaty varied from the Allied in the following ways:
 The Allied copy was presented in leather and gold lining with both countries' seals printed on the front, whereas the Japanese copy was bound in rough canvas with no seals on the front.
 The Canadian representative, Colonel Lawrence Moore Cosgrave, signed below his line instead of above it on the Allied copy, so everyone after him had to sign one line below the intended one. This was attributed to Cosgrave being blind in one eye from a World War I injury. When the discrepancy was pointed out to General Sutherland, he crossed out the pre-printed name titles of the Allied nations and rewrote by hand the titles in their correct relative positions. The Japanese initially found this alteration unacceptable—until Sutherland initialed (as an abbreviated signature) each alteration. The Japanese representatives did not complain further.

Current locations
The Allied copy of the Instrument is at the United States National Archives Building in Washington, D.C. The Japanese copy is at the Diplomatic Archives of the Ministry of Foreign Affairs of Japan in Tokyo, and was last publicly displayed in 2015, as part of an exhibition marking the 70th anniversary of the signing. A replica version of the Japanese copy can be viewed at the archive's gallery, and at the Edo-Tokyo Museum in Tokyo.

Gen. MacArthur originally had 11 full-sized facsimiles made of the Instrument of Surrender, but later increased this for distribution among the Allied nations present during the signing.  Two of the copies which were given to Col. LeGrande A. Diller and MGen. Basilio Valdes for the Philippines are now displayed at The International Museum of World War II in Natick, Massachusetts.

As witnesses, American general Jonathan Wainwright, who had surrendered the Philippines, and British lieutenant-general Arthur Percival, who had surrendered Singapore, received two of the six pens used by General MacArthur to sign the instrument. Another pen went to the West Point military academy, and one to MacArthur's aide. All of the pens used by MacArthur were black, except the last, which was bright red and went to his wife. A replica of it, along with copies of the instrument of surrender, is in a case on Missouri by the plaque marking the signing spot. The model of  USS Missouri in the National Museum of the United States Navy at the Washington Navy Yard, has a scale replica of the signing table in the correct location.

Gallery

See also
 Cairo Declaration (1943)
 General Order No. 1 (Aug. 1945)
 Retrocession Day (Oct. 1945)
 List of Allied ships at the Japanese surrender

Post-war
 Occupation of Japan
 Japanese holdouts
 Treaty of San Francisco (1951)
 Treaty of Taipei (1952)
 Soviet–Japanese Joint Declaration of 1956

Other Axis
 German Instrument of Surrender (1945)
 Armistice of Cassibile
 Treaty of Peace with Italy, 1947

Notes

References

External links

  National Archives & Records Administration Featured Document
 USS Missouris Captain Stuart Murray interviewed about the surrender ceremony
 Alsos Digital Library bibliography of references on Japan's surrender
 

 

1945 in Japan
1945 documents
Aftermath of World War II in Japan
Australia–Japan military relations
Canada–Japan relations
China–Japan relations
France–Japan relations
Japan in World War II
Japan–Netherlands relations
Japan–New Zealand relations
Japan–Soviet Union relations
Japan–United Kingdom military relations
Japan–United States military relations
Occupied Japan
September 1945 events in Asia
Surrender of Japan
Surrenders
World War II documents